Ravula, known locally as Yerava or Adiyan, is a Dravidian language of Karnataka and Kerala spoken by the Ravula and Adiyan. It is classified under the category Malayalam languages in both the linguistics and the Census of India. However their language exhibits a number of peculiarities which marks it off from Malayalam as well as from other tribal speeches in the districts of Kodagu and Wayanad. It is spoken by 25,000 Ravulas (locally called Yerava) in Kodagu district of Karnataka and by 1,900 Ravulas (locally called Adiyan) in the adjacent Wayanad district of Kerala. The term 'Yerava' is derived from the Kannada word Yeravalu meaning borrow.

Phonology 
Adiya's phonology is similar to Malayalam with a few differences.

 All vowels except for /ɪ,ə,ʊ,ɔ/ demonstrate contrastive vowel length.

Consonants

References

Dravidian languages